Robert William Langsford   (born Robert Hugo Lankswert) (August 5, 1865 – January 10, 1907), was a Major League Baseball shortstop for the 1899 Louisville Colonels.

External links

1865 births
1907 suicides
Major League Baseball shortstops
Baseball players from Louisville, Kentucky
Louisville Colonels players
19th-century baseball players
Terre Haute Hottentots players
Evansville Hoosiers players
Aurora Indians players
Peoria Distillers players
Mobile Blackbirds players
Nashville Tigers players
New Orleans Pelicans (baseball) players
Omaha Omahogs players
Milwaukee Brewers (minor league) players
Memphis Lambs players
Memphis Giants players
Montgomery Grays players
Owensboro Corncrackers players
Norfolk Braves players
Toledo Mud Hens players
Suicides in Kentucky
Suicides by poison